Widemarsh Common is a public open space in Hereford. It is owned by Herefordshire Council and is used primarily as a recreational ground for both cricket and football. It is the home pitch for Hereford Lads Club Cricket Club.

It was once the location for local cider firm W.M.Evans & Co who were eventually bought by Bulmers.  The location of the company premises is not entirely clear.

Saint John Kemble was hanged, drawn and quartered at the common on 22 August 1679.

References

External links
 A 1932 aerial view from the English Heritage Britain from Above website.

Hereford
Geography of Herefordshire
Sports venues in Herefordshire